"Submarines" is a poem written by Rudyard Kipling (1865-1936), and set to music by the English composer Edward Elgar in 1917, as the third of a set of four war-related songs on nautical subjects for which he chose the title "The Fringes of the Fleet".

Like the others in the cycle, is intended for four baritone voices.  It was originally written with orchestral accompaniment, but it was later published to be sung with piano accompaniment.

The composer does not make clear which sections of the song, if any, are to be sung solo or in chorus.

The poem was titled by Kipling Tin Fish.

Poem

The musical setting repeats the first stanza.

The Fringes of the Fleet 
Kipling's book Sea Warfare (1916) republished The Fringes of the Fleet (1915) and included a section Tales of "The Trade" about the Submarine Service. It included a poem titled "The Trade" which begins:

References

External links 
 Sea Warfare - The Fringes of the Fleet Notes by Alastair Wilson

Songs by Edward Elgar
Poetry by Rudyard Kipling
1917 songs